Mangamutu is a small settlement, on the western outskirts of Pahiatua, in the North Island of New Zealand. The Wairarapa Line runs through the area, with the Pahiatua railway station in the settlement. The settlement was the birthplace of former New Zealand Prime Minister Sir Keith Holyoake.

Etymology 
Mangamutu takes its name from the nearby Mangamutu stream. It is a Māori phrase meaning finished stream from the words manga meaning stream and mutu meaning finished.

Economy 
Mangamutu is home to a significant Fonterra dairy factory. The factory was originally commissioned by the Tui Dairy Company in 1976; Tui merged with Hāwera-based Kiwi Dairies in 1996, who in turn merged with the New Zealand Dairy Group in 2001 to form Fonterra.

References 

Populated places in Manawatū-Whanganui
Tararua District